Cven may refer to:

 Cven, Ljutomer, a village in Slovenia
 ŠD Cven, a Slovenian football club

See also 

 
 Kven (disambiguation)
 Cwen (disambiguation)